Noël Forgeard (born 8 December 1946 in La Ferté-Gaucher) is a French industrialist and former joint CEO of EADS.

Appointment
From April 1998 until June 2005, Forgeard was CEO of the aircraft manufacturer Airbus SAS.

In late 2004, he was nominated as the next French CEO of EADS. This position is shared with a German—then Thomas Enders—in a system that was established at the creation of EADS in 2000.

Alleged insider dealing
News reports in June 2006 focused on possible insider dealing at EADS. Forgeard made a 2.5 million Euro profit on the sale of EADS shares, with his children earning 4.2 million Euro, just weeks before news of Airbus A380 delays was released. Forgeard denied any wrongdoing, claiming that he was a scapegoat in the matter.

Forgeard resigned as CEO of EADS on 2 July 2006 and was replaced by Christian Streiff.

References

External links
  EADS finally names its new bosses - BBC News, 26 June 2005
  EADS and Airbus bosses both quit - BBC News, 2 July 2006

1946 births
Living people
French chief executives
École Polytechnique alumni
Mines Paris - PSL alumni
Corps des mines
Airbus people
Officiers of the Légion d'honneur
Honorary Knights Commander of the Order of the British Empire